Robert Wells Marshall (March 12, 1880 – August 27, 1958) was an American sportsman. He was best known for playing football; however, Marshall also competed in baseball, track, boxing, ice hockey and wrestling.

When Marshall played baseball for Minneapolis Central High School, he played first base for three years.                     Central was the champion of the Twin Cities High Schools for Marshall's junior and senior years, of 1900 and 1901.

When he played baseball for the University of Minnesota, he also played first base for two years, 1904 and 1905, helping the university to win the Western Conference Championship in 1905.

Marshall played end for the football team of the University of Minnesota from 1904 to 1906. In 1906, Marshall kicked a 48-yard field goal to beat the University of Chicago 4-2 (field goals counted as four points). He was the first African American to play football in the Western Conference (later the Big Ten). He graduated in 1907 and played with Minneapolis pro teams, the Deans and the Marines. From 1920 through 1924, he played in the National Football League with the Rock Island Independents, the Minneapolis Marines, and the Duluth Kelleys. Along with Fritz Pollard, he was one of the two first African Americans to play in the NFL.

Personal life

Marshall was the son of Richard Marshall and Symanthia Gillespie Marshall. His maternal grandfather was Ezekiel Gillespie, a former slave and civil rights pioneer. His aunt was Jessie Gillespie Herndon, the second wife of Alonzo Herndon, founder and president of the Atlanta Life Insurance Company, one of the most successful black-owned insurance businesses in the nation. While in high school, Marshall's mother died, and he began working as a janitor to support his three siblings.

In 1918, Marshall married Irene Knott of Great Falls, Montana. The couple had four children.

Baseball career

Shortly after graduating from the University of Minnesota with a degree in law, Marshall played third base for the Minneapolis "Lund-Lands" for one season, in 1906. He played third base for one season for Lamoure, North Dakota helping the team win third place in a league of eight teams.

Outside of athletics, Marshall practiced law as an attorney in the law office of Mr. William H. H. Franklin, and later at the well known firm of Nash and Armstrong.

Marshall left the law offices, spending many years back on the diamonds, playing semi-pro baseball for pre-Negro National Leagues. In 1908, he played utility for the Minneapolis Keystones, then moved to first base later in the season. In 1909, he joined the St. Paul Colored Gophers. In 1910, he split the season between the Chicago Giants and the Colored Gophers, appearing for and managing the Colored Gophers team occasionally until at least 1916.

Marshall bought the Colored Gophers team in 1911.

In a 1916 game, Marshall brought in "Cannonball Jackson" a pitcher acquired from J. L. Wilkinson's All Nations team. Marshall would later appear in games with John Donaldson and the All Nations team in 1923.

Later life and death

At the end of the 1911 season, Marshall received an appointment in the Minnesota state grain department, where he worked for the next 39 years.

For years, Marshall coached youngsters in football and boxing in Minneapolis. At his retirement from his government job in 1950, he was honored with a testimonial dinner, whose attendees included Minnesota Governor Luther Youngdahl and legendary Gophers football coach Bernie Bierman.

Marshall died of Alzheimer's disease in 1958. He was inducted into the College Football Hall of Fame in 1971.

See also

 List of African-American firsts

References

External links
 
Baseball statistics and player information from Baseball-Reference Black Baseball Stats and Seamheads 
  "A century ago, Bobby Marshall made history in NFL's first game, Bobby Marshall, a 40-year-old Black lawyer from Minneapolis, played in the NFL's first game," by Mark Craig, Minneapolis Star Tribune, Oct. 4, 2020
 

1880 births
1958 deaths
American football ends
Baseball first basemen
All Nations players
Duluth Kelleys players
Minneapolis Marines players
Minnesota Golden Gophers football players
Minnesota Golden Gophers baseball players
Minneapolis Keystones players
Rock Island Independents players
St. Paul Colored Gophers players
College Football Hall of Fame inductees
Players of American football from Milwaukee
Players of American football from Minneapolis
Baseball players from Milwaukee
Baseball players from Minneapolis
African-American players of American football
African-American baseball managers
Deaths from Alzheimer's disease
Janitors
Central High School (Minneapolis, Minnesota) alumni
Neurological disease deaths in Minnesota
20th-century African-American people